Jerónimo de la Fuente (born 24 February 1991) is an Argentine rugby union footballer who plays as a centre for USAP Perpignan and the Argentina national rugby union team.

Career

De la Fuente began his club career in his native Argentina for the Duendes Rugby Club in his home city of Rosario.  He earned selection for the Pampas XV squad for the 2013 Vodacom Cup in South Africa and also for their tour of Australia in 2014.

International career

De la Fuente played for Argentina Under-20 at the 2011 IRB Junior World Championship.
He then played further representative rugby for the Argentina Jaguars and the Pumas 7s throughout 2012 and 2013.

De la Fuente made his senior international debut in 2014. His first appearance for Los Pumas came on 17 May 2014 against , he followed that up a week later with a try on his second international appearance against . Despite this he was named in the 30-man squad for the 2014 Rugby Championship. He was not initially selected for the Pumas opening match against the Springboks, however a late injury to Juan Martín Hernández saw De la Fuente promoted to the replacements bench and he made his championship debut as a second-half substitute in a 6-13 loss.

References

1991 births
Living people
Sportspeople from Rosario, Santa Fe
Rugby union centres
Duendes Rugby Club players
Jaguares (Super Rugby) players
Pampas XV players
Argentine rugby union players
Argentina international rugby union players
Male rugby sevens players
Argentina international rugby sevens players